Events from the year 1891 in Denmark.

Incumbents
 Monarch – Christian IX
 Prime minister – J. B. S. Estrup

Events

Undated

Culture

Sports
 3 May  Vejle Boldklub is founded.

Births
 April 7 – Ole Kirk Christiansen, entrepreneur and businessman, inventor of Lego (d.1958)
 October 1 – Svend Methling, actor (died 1977)

Deaths
 8 April – Elise Holst, stage actress (born 1811)
 9 June – Ludvig Lorenz, mathematician and physicist (born 1829)
 15 August  Louise Sahlgreenm actress (born 1818)
 28 November – Christen Berg, politician (born 1829)
 21 December – Georg Emil Hansen, photographer (born 1833)

References

 
1890s in Denmark
Denmark
Years of the 19th century in Denmark